The Sokhotski–Plemelj theorem (Polish spelling is Sochocki) is a theorem in complex analysis, which helps in evaluating certain integrals. The real-line version of it (see below) is often used in physics, although rarely referred to by name. The theorem is named after Julian Sochocki, who proved it in 1868, and Josip Plemelj, who rediscovered it as a main ingredient of his solution of the Riemann–Hilbert problem in 1908.

Statement of the theorem 
Let C be a smooth closed simple curve in the plane, and  an analytic function on C. Note that the Cauchy-type integral

cannot be evaluated for any z on the curve C. However, on the interior and exterior of the curve, the integral produces analytic functions, which will be denoted  inside C and  outside. The Sokhotski–Plemelj formulas relate the limiting boundary values of these two analytic functions at a point z on C and the Cauchy principal value  of the integral:

Subsequent generalizations relax the smoothness requirements on curve C and the function φ.

Version for the real line

Especially important is the version for integrals over the real line.

Then

where  denotes the Cauchy principal value. (Note that this version makes no use of analyticity.)

A particularly important consequence of this is obtained when taking :

where  is the Dirac delta function.

Proof of the real version 

A simple proof is as follows.

For the first term, we note that  is a nascent delta function, and therefore approaches a Dirac delta function in the limit. Therefore, the first term equals ∓i f(0).

For the second term, we note that the factor  approaches 1 for |x| ≫ ε, approaches 0 for |x| ≪ ε, and is exactly symmetric about 0. Therefore, in the limit, it turns the integral into a Cauchy principal value integral.

For simple proof of the complex version of the formula and version for polydomains see:

Physics application 

In quantum mechanics and quantum field theory, one often has to evaluate integrals of the form

where E is some energy and t is time. This expression, as written, is undefined (since the time integral does not converge), so it is typically modified by adding a negative real term to -iEt in the exponential, and then taking that to zero, i.e.:

where the latter step uses the real version of the theorem.

Heitler function 
In theoretical quantum optics, the derivation of a master equation in Lindblad form often requires the following integral function, which is a direct consequence of the Sokhotski–Plemelj theorem and is often called the Heitler-function:

See also
Singular integral operators on closed curves (account of the Sokhotski–Plemelj theorem for the unit circle and a closed Jordan curve)
Kramers–Kronig relations
Hilbert transform

References

Literature 

 Chapter 3.1.
 Appendix A, equation (A.19).

 Blanchard, Bruening: Mathematical Methods in Physics (Birkhauser 2003), Example 3.3.1 4

Theorems in complex analysis